The Wentai Pagoda is a pagoda in Gucheng Village, Jincheng Township, Kinmen County, Taiwan. The pagoda is a tower of feng shui erected for worshiping star and its incarnation.

History
The pagoda was built in 1387 during the 20th year of Hongwu Emperor of Ming Dynasty by Marquess Chianghsia Chou Te-hsing. It was built to serve as navigational marker for ships negotiating the treacherous waters near Kinmen and also for defense of Kinmen from the Japanese pirates. The tower is classified as second grade national historic relic. The tower was damaged during an earthquake in 1918 and also in 1961 due to war.

Architecture
The pagoda is a five-level hexagon granite building. Its peak features carvings and relief works and the stone on its base exhibits Chinese calligraphy written by Ming scholar Chen Hui and contemporary artist Chang Ta-chien.

Transportation
The pagoda is accessible by bus or taxi west from Kinmen Airport.

See also
 Longfeng Temple, Jinsha Township
 List of temples in Taiwan
 Religion in Taiwan

References

1387 establishments in Asia
14th-century establishments in China
Buildings and structures in Kinmen County
Jincheng Township
National monuments of Taiwan
Pagodas in Taiwan
Tourist attractions in Kinmen County